Ghost soldier may refer to:

Ghost soldiers, people whose names appear on military rolls, but are not in military service, generally used to divert salaries
Ghost Soldier, a 2006 war drama directed by Allan Tsao
Ghost Soldier, a 2001 book by Elaine Marie Alphin
Ghost Soldier, a 2014 children's book by Theresa Breslin (UK)
Ghost Soldier, a 2014 book by Evelyn Klebert 
Ghost Soldiers, a 2002 non-fiction book by Hampton Sides
Ghost Soldiers, a 2012 fiction by Keith Melton
Ghost Soldiers of Gettysburg: Searching for Spirits on America's Most Famous Battlefield, a 2014 fiction 
Ghost Army soldiers, part of a United States Army tactical deception unit during World War II
Shabiha, Arabic for ghost, an ultra-loyal militia enforcing rule of Syria's Assad family